Afzelia rhomboidea is a species of plant in the family Fabaceae. It is found in Indonesia, Malaysia, and the Philippines. It is threatened by habitat loss.

References

rhomboidea
Vulnerable plants
Decorative fruits and seeds
Taxonomy articles created by Polbot
Taxa named by Celestino Fernández-Villar
Taxa named by Francisco Manuel Blanco
Fabales of Asia